This is a list of public art in Hyde Park, London.

A Royal Park since 1536, Hyde Park covers an area of over 350 acres. Its present landscaping dates largely to the 18th century, when Queen Caroline introduced the Serpentine among other features, and to the 1820s, when Decimus Burton made improvements including the park's triumphal entrance at Wellington Arch. In the immediate vicinity of the arch, at Hyde Park Corner, there is a significant concentration of war memorials.

Hyde Park

Hyde Park Corner
The high concentration of military memorials at Hyde Park Corner, centred on Wellington Arch, has been called "one of the world's most important groups of war memorials". The arch was originally crowned with a colossal equestrian statue of the Duke of Wellington, which in 1883 was removed to Aldershot in Hampshire. The RAF Bomber Command Memorial, inaugurated in 2012, is located a short distance away in Green Park.

Marble Arch

See also
 Christo and Jeanne-Claude § The London Mastaba, a temporary floating installation in the Serpentine in 2018
 List of public art in Kensington Gardens
 List of public art in Knightsbridge

References

Bibliography

External links
 Memorials, fountains and statues (in Hyde Park) at The Royal Parks' official website

Hyde Park
 Public art